The 2022–23 Gibraltar Intermediate League is the fifth season of under-23 football in Gibraltar, after reforms to reserve team football in June 2018. The league will be contested by 11 teams - ten under-23 sides of the Gibraltar Football League clubs plus Hound Dogs.

Manchester 62 are the reigning champions. The league kicked off on 6 September 2022.

Format
The Gibraltar Intermediate League was established by the Gibraltar Football Association in June 2018 as a merger of the pre-existing Reserves Division and Under 18 Division, in order to aid player development on the territory. Competing clubs are required to register a reserve squad of 18 players, of which 13 must be Gibraltarian.

Teams

Mons Calpe declined to enter a team this season, taking the number of teams down to 11. Due to the lack of resources necessary to compete in the Gibraltar Football League, Hound Dogs were granted special permission by the Gibraltar FA to participate as a senior side in the Intermediate League.

Note: Flags indicate national team as has been defined under FIFA eligibility rules. Players may hold more than one non-FIFA nationality.

League table

Season statistics

Scoring

Top scorers

Clean Sheets

1Includes one clean sheet for Europa Intermediate

See also
2022–23 Gibraltar Football League
2022–23 Gibraltar Women's Football League

References

Intermediate